Blaga is both a surname and a given name. Notable people with the name include:

Iosif Blaga (1864-1937), Romanian literary theorist, educator and politician 
 Lucian Blaga (1895–1961), Romanian poet, playwright and philosopher
Vasile Blaga (born 1956), Romanian politician
Blaga Dimitrova (1922–2003), Bulgarian poet

Romanian-language surnames